Sakura Wars is a video game series developed and published by Sega. Its first game premiered in Japan in 1996 and Sakura Wars games have later been on nearly every video game console since the Sega Saturn, including Dreamcast, Sega Titan, Game Boy Color, PlayStation Portable, Microsoft Windows, Wii, PlayStation 2, Nintendo DS, PlayStation 4 and several models of mobile phone.

In addition to the six games released as part of the main series and their many spin-offs and related titles, the Sakura Wars series has spawned many works in other media including anime, movies, novels and manga, and radio dramas. For the Sakura Taisen World Project, seven games were announced: Sakura Taisen: Atsuki Chishio ni, Sakura Taisen V: Saraba itoshiki hito yo, Sakura Taisen V: Episode 0, Sakura Taisen Monogatari - Teito-hen & Paris-hen, a title that tells the story of the Anti-Kouma Battle Squadron and the Kouma War. Also announced was a game that took place during the Sengoku Jidai and a PC port of Is Paris Burning.

Video games

Main series

Prequels and side stories

Compilations and collections

Spin-offs

Film and television

Soundtracks
The composer of the series is Kohei Tanaka. In addition to the original soundtracks, listed below, many games have inspired orchestral or vocal albums as well as compilation albums featuring music from several Sakura Wars games.

Novels and manga
Many Sakura Wars games have been adapted as novels and manga series. With the advent of the Internet, web novels and digital publishing have also become common. These stories act as companion pieces, offering an interpretation of the game's events or expanding the plot of the games by depicting additional scenarios.

Live performances

From 1997 onwards, the voice actors of the series performed onstage and in-character as their Sakura Wars counterparts in a series of live-action musical stage shows. By 2001 to 2006, the Imperial Combat Revue performed two major musicals in a year: a New Year's Show and a Summer Kayou Show, in addition to multitudes of other smaller shows where one or more characters make appearances.  Some of the stage performances could be seen in the series' other forms of media.

In August 2006, the Imperial Combat Revue held their final summer show.  Although the live-action shows still continue as of May 2007, they are no longer focused entirely on the Imperial Combat Revue.

Summer Kayou Shows

Super Kayou Shows

New Year Kayou Shows

See also
 List of Japanese role-playing game franchises

References

ADV Films
Sakura Wars
Sakura Wars
Sakura Wars
Sakura Wars